Abū Bakr is an Arabic given name meaning "Father of a Young Camel" (Abu meaning 'Father of' and Bakr meaning 'Young Camel') that is widely used by Sunni Muslims.

Other transliterations include Abu Bakar, Abu Bekr, Ebubekir, Aboubacar, Abubakar, etc. The two parts of the name can be written together, hyphenated, or separately.

The most famous person to carry this name was Abu Bakr al-Siddiq ( 573–634), one of the companions of the prophet Muhammad and the first caliph of Islam. He was also Muhammad's father-in-law through Aisha. His real name was Abdullah, Abu Bakr being his kunya.

Persons with the name 
People with the name include:

Early and medieval Islam 
 Abu Bakr al-Siddiq (c. 573–634)
 Abu Bakr ibn Ali (died 680 in the Battle of Karbala)
 Abu Bakr ibn Hasan ibn Ali (died 680 in the Battle of Karbala)
 Abu Bakr ibn Abd al-Aziz ibn Marwān, was an Umayyad prince, son of Abd al-Aziz and brother of Umar II.
 Abu Bakr ibn Muhammad ibn Hazm (died 737), Sunni Islamic scholar based in Madinah, Saudi Arabia
 Abu Bakr al-Isfahani (died 908), Persian scholar in Warsh recitation
 Abu Bakr ibn Muhammad al-Muhtadi, was the Abbasid prince and son of Caliph Al-Muhtadi.
 Abu Bakr al-Khallal (died 923), Muslim jurist
 Abu Bakr Muhammad ibn Zakariyya' al-Razi (c. 865–925), Persian physician, alchemist, and philosopher
 Abu Bakr Ibn Mujāhid (c. 860–936), Iraqi Islamic scholar
 Abu Bakr Muhammad (died 941), Muhtajid ruler of Chaghaniyan and governor of Samanid Khurasan
 Abu Bakr al-Sajistani (died 941), Islamic scholar
 Abu Bakr al-Shibli (861–946), Sufi of Persian descent, disciple of Junayd Baghdadi
 Abu Bakr bin Yahya al-Suli (880–946), Arab shatranj player
 Abu Bakr Ibn Al-Qutia (died 997), historian and author born in Córdoba, Spain
 Abu Bakr Ahmed ibn 'Ali ibn Qays al-Wahshiyah, or Ibn Wahshiyya (9th/10th centuries), Iraqi alchemist, agriculturalist, farm toxicologist, egyptologist and historian
 Abu Bakr al-Alami al-Idrissi (died 10th-century), ancestor of the Alami Sayyids of Morocco and leader of the Beni Arrous tribe
 Abu Bakr al-Kalabadhi (late 10th Century), Bukhara Sufi, author of the Kitab at-ta'arruf
 Abu Bakr Muḥammad ibn al-Ṭayyib al-Baqillani (930–1013), Iraqi Islamic scholar, theologian and logician
 Abu Bakr Muhammad ibn al-Hasan ibn Furak (941–1015) Muslim Imam, specialist of Arabic language, grammar and poetry, an orator, a jurist, and a hadith scholar from the Shafi'i Madhab
 Abu Bakr Abd al-Karīm ibn al-Faḍl al-Muti better known by his regnal name At-Ta'i, was the caliph of Baghdad from 974 to 991.
 Abul-Mahāsin Abu Bakr Zaynuddin Azraqi (died 1072), Persian poet
 Abu Bakr ibn Umar (died 1087),  Almoravid ruler
 Abu Bakr al-Turtushi (1059–1127), Muslim jurist and political theorist from Tortosa, Spain
 Abu Bakr ibn al-Arabi (1076–1148), judge and scholar of Maliki law from al-Andalus
 Abu Bakr Abd al-Malik ibn Quzman (1078–1160) poet in al-Andalus
 Abû Bakr Muḥammad Ibn Yaḥyà ibn aṣ-Ṣâ’igh at-Tûjîbî Ibn Bâjja al-Tujibi, known as Avempace, (c. 1085–1138), Andalusian polymath: whose writings cover astronomy, physics, psychology, music, etc.
 Abu Bakr Muhammad ibn Abd al-Malik ibn Muhammad ibn Tufail al-Qaisi al-Andalusi; (1105–1185), Andalusian Arab physician and philosopher
 Abu Bakr al-Hassar or Abu Bakr ibn Muhammad ibn Ayyash al Hassar (12th century), Muslim mathematician from Morocco
 al-Adil Sayf al-Din Abu-Bakr ibn Ayyub or Al-Adil I (1145–1218), Ayyubid-Egyptian general, brother of Saladin
 Abu Bakr Ibn Sayyid al-Nās (1200–1261), Almohad theologian.
 Saif ad-Dīn al-Malik al-ʿĀdil Abū Bakr b. Nāṣir ad-Dīn Muḥammad or Al-Adil II (1221?–1248), Ayyubid sultan of Egypt
 Abubakr Sa'd ibn Zangy (1231–1260), ruler of Shiraz
 Abu Bakr (mid 13th century), brother and companion of Sunjata, founder of the Mali Empire
 Abu Bakr (late 13th century), mansa of the Mali Empire
 Saif ad-Din Abu-Bakr (c. 1321–1341), Mamluk sultan of Egypt
 Abu Bakr ibn Faris (died 1359), Marinid Sultan
 Abu Bakr Shah (died 1390), ruler of the Tughlaq dynasty
 Aboobakuru I of the Maldives (died 1443?), sultan of Maldives during 1443
 Abu Bakr al-Aydarus (1447–1508), Hadhrami religious scholar of Sufism and poet
 Mirza Abu Bakr Dughlat (died after 1514), ruler in eastern Central Asia, an emir of the Dughlat tribe
 Abu Bakr ibn Muhammad (died 1526), sultan of Adal
 Abu Bakr Mirza (died 1602), self-declared Shah of Shirvan after the downfall of Kavus Mirza
 Abu Bakr Ibn Braham(Commons) (died 1691), mapmaker

18th century to present 
 Abu Bakr al-Siddiq (enslaved man from Timbuktu), ca. 1834
 Abu Bakr Atiku (1782–1842), sultan of the Sokoto Caliphate or Fulani Empire
 Abu Bakr II ibn ʽAbd al-Munan (died 1852), emir of Harar
 Abu Bakr Effendi (1814–1880), Ottoman qadi of Kurdish descent in the Cape of Good Hope from 1862 to 1880
 Abu Bakar of Johor (1833–1895), Sultan of Johor
 Mulla Abu Bakr Effendi, or just Mulla Effendi (1863–1942), Kurdish Muslim cleric, Islamic philosopher, scholar, astronomer and politician
 Abu Bakar bin Taha (1882–1956), Yemen-born Islamic educator in Singapore
 Abu Bakr Ahmad Haleem (1897–1975), Pakistani political scientist and first vice-chancellor of Karachi University
 Abu Bakar of Pahang (1904–1974), Sultan of Pahang
 Abu Bakr Khairat (1910–1963), Egyptian composer of classical music
 Abubakar Tafawa Balewa (1912–1966), first prime minister of independent Nigeria
 Aboubakar Sangoulé Lamizana (1916–2005), second President of Upper Volta (now Burkina Faso)
 Roqia Abubakr (1917-after 1973), one of the first four women elected to parliament in Afghanistan
 Aboubakar Abdel Rahmane (died 1979), Chadian warlord
 Abubakar Olusola Saraki (1933–2012), Nigerian politician
 Abu Bakar Ba'asyir (born 1938), Indonesian Muslim cleric
 Aboubakar Diaby Ouattara (born 1938), diplomat from Côte d'Ivoire
 Datti Abubakar (1939–2005), Military Governor of Anambra State in Nigeria
 Haidar Abu Bakr al-Attas (born 1939), Yemeni politician and sometime Prime Minister
 Sheikh Abubakr Ahmad (born 1939), leader of one of the traditionalist Sunni (Sufi) Muslims (shafi) in Kerala, India
 Abubakar Rimi (1940–2010), Nigerian politician
 Abu Bakr Baira (born 1941), Libyan politician, Acting President of the Council of Deputies of Libya
 Yasin Abu Bakr (1941–2021), leader of the Jamaat al Muslimeen, a Muslim group in Trinidad and Tobago.
 Abu Bakr al-Qirbi (born 1942), Yemeni politician
 Abdulsalami Abubakar (born 1942), Nigerian general and politician
 Abu Baker Asvat (1943–1989), murdered South African activist and medical doctor
 Aboubacar Somparé (born 1944), Guinean politician, President of the National Assembly
 Abu Bakar Abdul Jamal (born 1946), admiral in the Malaysian Navy
 Atiku Abubakar (born 1946), Nigerian politician
 Boubaker Ayadi (born 1949), Tunisian author
 Mustafa Abubakar (born 1949), Indonesian politician
 Abu-Bakr Yunis Jabr (1952–2011), Libyan Minister of Defence under Gaddafi
 Abu Bakar (1952–2019), Indonesian regent of West Bandung
 Sa'adu Abubakar (born 1956), Sultan of Sokoto in northern Nigeria
 Abu Bakr, name used by Australian militant activist Abdul Nacer Benbrika (born c. 1960)
 Aboubacar Ibrahim Abani (born 1962), Nigerian diplomat
 Abubakar Bukola Saraki (born 1962), Nigerian politician
 Aboubakr Jamaï (born 1968), Moroccan journalist and banker
 Abu Bakker Qassim (born 1969), Uyghur who was held in Guantanamo Bay
 Abu Bakr al-Baghdadi (1971–2019) as Ibrahim Awad Ibrahim al-Badri, leader of the Islamic State of Iraq and the Levant (ISIL) militant group and self-proclaimed caliph.
 Aboubacar Doumbia (born 1974), also known as Abou Nidal, Ivorian singer
 Aboubakar Soumahoro (born 1980), Italian-Ivorian trade unionist, labor activist and politician
 Abu Bakr Mansha (born 1983/1984), convicted under the British Terrorism Act 2000
 Abu Bakar (Dubrovka attack) or Abubakar, pseudonym of Khanpasha Terkibayev, perpetrator of the 2002 Dubrovka attack
 Abu-Bakr al-Mansouri, Libyan politician, secretary for Agriculture, Animal Wealth and Marine Resources
 Abubakar Salim (born 1993), British actor and video game voice actor

Sportspeople 
 Abu Bakr Ratib (active 1928), Egyptian fencer
 Abubakar Al-Mass (born 1955), Yemeni footballer
 Aboubakar Camara (born 1965), former rugby union footballer and current coach from Côte d'Ivoire
 Aboubacar Cissé (born 1969), Ivorian footballer
 Aboubacar Titi Camara, (born 1972), Guinean footballer
 Aboubacar Mario Bangoura (born 1977), Guinean football referee
 Abubaker Tabula (born 1980), Ugandan footballer
 Aboubacar Guindo (born 1981), Malian footballer
 Abubakari Yakubu (born 1981), Ghanaian footballer
 Abubakr Al Abaidy (born 1981), Libyan footballer
 Aboubacar Bangoura (born 1982), Guinean international footballer
 Aboubakar Koné (born 1982), footballer from Côte d'Ivoire
 Abubakari Yahuza (born 1983), Ghanaian footballer
 Aboubacar Tandia (born 1983), French footballer
 Aboubacar Sylla (born 1983), Guinean footballer
 Abubaker Ali Kamal (born 1983), Qatari runner who has specialized in the 1500 metres and 3000 metres steeplechase
 Aboubacar M'Baye Camara (born 1985), Guinean footballer
 Radanfah Abu Bakr (born 1987), Trinidadian footballer
 Abubakar Bello-Osagie (born 1988), Nigerian footballer
 Mé Aboubacar Diomandé (born 1988), Ivorian footballer
 Aboubacar Camara (born 1988), Guinean footballer
 Abubaker Kaki Khamis (born 1989), Sudanese runner who specializes in the 800 metres
 Mohd Faizal Abu Bakar (born 1990), Malaysian footballer
 Abou Bakr Al-Mel (born 1992), Lebanese footballer
 Vincent Aboubakar (born 1992), Cameroonian international football player
 Lalas Abubakar (born 1994), Ghanaian footballer
 Aboubacar Doumbia (born 1995), Malian footballer
 Aboubacar Keita (born 2000), American footballer

Other uses 
 Hazrati Abu Bakr Siddique, mosque in Flushing, Queens, New York
 Abu Bakar Royal Mosque, Pahang, Malaysia
 Saidina Abu Bakar As Siddiq Mosque, Kuala Lumpur, Malaysia
 Sultan Abu Bakar State Mosque, Johor, Malaysia
 Sultan Abu Bakar Complex, customs, immigration and quarantine complex, Malaysia
 Abubakar Tafawa Balewa University, Bauchi, Nigeria
 BNS Abu Bakr (1982), Bangladeshi warship
 BNS Abu Bakr (2014), Bangladeshi warship

See also 
 Boubacar, West African version of the same name

References 

Arabic masculine given names